The Fluvià is a river in Catalonia.  It rises in the Serralada Transversal, passes through Olot and Besalú, and flows into the Mediterranean Sea near Sant Pere Pescador.  The ancient city of Empúries was founded near the mouth of the Fluvià, when it was 6 km south of its present location.

See also 
 List of rivers of Spain

Rivers of Spain
Rivers of Catalonia